Jane Mallory Birkin, OBE (born 14 December 1946) is an English-French singer and actress. She attained international fame and notability for her decade-long musical and romantic partnership with Serge Gainsbourg. She also had a prolific career as an actress in British and French cinema.

A native of London, Birkin began her career as an actress, appearing in minor roles in Michelangelo Antonioni's Blowup (1966), and Kaleidoscope (1966). In 1968, she met Serge Gainsbourg while co-starring with him in Slogan, which marked the beginning of a years-long working and personal relationship. The duo released their debut album Jane Birkin/Serge Gainsbourg (1969), and Birkin also appeared in the controversial film Je t'aime moi non plus (1976) under Gainsbourg's direction. Birkin would attain further acting credits in the Agatha Christie adaptations Death on the Nile (1978), and Evil Under the Sun (1982).

After separating from Gainsbourg in 1980, Birkin continued to work as both an actress and a singer, appearing in various independent films and recording numerous solo albums. In 1991, she appeared in the miniseries Red Fox, and in the American drama film A Soldier's Daughter Never Cries, in 1998. In 2016, she starred in the Academy Award-nominated short film La femme et le TGV, which she said would be her final film role.

Birkin has lived mainly in France since the 1970s. She is the mother of photographer Kate Barry, with her first husband John Barry; actress and singer Charlotte Gainsbourg, with Serge Gainsbourg; and musician Lou Doillon, with Jacques Doillon. In addition to her acting and musical credits, she lent her name to the Hermès Birkin handbag.

Early life 
Jane Mallory Birkin was born on 14 December 1946, in Marylebone, London. Her mother, Judy Campbell, was an English actress, best known for her work on stage. Her father, David Birkin, was a Royal Navy lieutenant commander and World War II spy. Her brother is screenwriter and director Andrew Birkin. She is first cousin twice removed to theatre and opera director Sophie Hunter. Birkin was raised in Chelsea, and described herself as a "shy English girl."

She attended Miss Ironside's School in Kensington. She was also educated at Upper Chine School, Isle of Wight. At age 17, she met composer John Barry, whom she married in 1965 and with whom she had her first daughter, Kate, in 1967. After the couple divorced in 1968, Birkin returned to live with her family in London, and began to audition for film and television roles in England and Los Angeles, California.

Career

Early acting credits 
Birkin emerged in the Swinging London scene of the 1960s, appearing in an uncredited part in The Knack ...and How to Get It (1965). She had more substantial roles in the counterculture era films Blowup and Kaleidoscope (both 1966), as a fantasy-like model in the psychedelic film Wonderwall (1968) and in the erotic French thriller La Piscine (1969). That same year, she auditioned in France for the lead female role in the film Slogan (1969). Though she did not speak French she won the role, co-starring alongside Serge Gainsbourg, and she performed with him on the film's theme song, "La Chanson de Slogan" – the first of many collaborations between the two. After filming Slogan, Birkin relocated to France permanently.

Collaborations with Serge Gainsbourg 

In 1969,  Gainsbourg and she released the duet "Je t'aime... moi non plus" ("I love you ... me neither"). Gainsbourg originally had written the song for Brigitte Bardot. The song caused a scandal for its sexual explicitness, and was banned by radio stations in Italy, Spain, and the United Kingdom.

"Je t'aime" made UK chart history in that on 4 October 1969 and the following week on 11 October, the song was at two different chart positions, though it is the same song, the same artists, and the same recorded version. The only difference was that they were on different record labels. It was originally released on the Fontana label, but due to its controversy, Fontana withdrew the record, which was then released on the Major Minor label. Because Fontana singles were still in the shops along with the Major Minor release, on 4 October 1969, the Major Minor release was at number three and the Fontana single at number 16. Also at that time, it was the biggest-selling single ever for a completely foreign-language record. She appeared on Gainsbourg's 1971 album Histoire de Melody Nelson, portraying the Lolita-like protagonist in song and on the cover. Reflecting on being a muse and collaborator of Gainsbourg's, Birkin commented: "[It is] very flattering to have the most beautiful songs, probably, in the French language written for one. [But] how much talent did I really have? Perhaps not that much."

She took a break from acting in 1971–1972, but returned as Brigitte Bardot's lover in Don Juan, or If Don Juan Were a Woman (1973). The same year, she had a supporting role in the horror film Dark Places with Christopher Lee and Joan Collins. In 1975, she appeared in Gainsbourg's first film, Je t'aime moi non plus, which created a stir for frank examination of sexual ambiguity, and was banned in the United Kingdom by the British Board of Film Classification. For this performance, she was nominated for a Best Actress César Award.

Later performances and recordings 

In 1978, Birkin modeled in trade advertisements for Lee Cooper jeans. She then appeared in the Agatha Christie films Death on the Nile (1978) and Evil Under the Sun (1982), and recorded several albums, including Baby Alone in Babylone, Amours des Feintes, Lolita Go Home, and Rendez-vous. She won Female Artist of the Year in the 1992 Victoires de la Musique. She starred in two films directed by Jacques Doillon – as Anne in La fille prodigue (1981) and as Alma in La pirate (1984, nominated for a César Award). This work led to an invitation from Patrice Chéreau to star on stage in La Fausse suivante by Marivaux at Nanterre. She worked with director Herbert Vesely on Egon Schiele Exzess und Bestrafung in 1980, appearing as the mistress of Austrian artist Egon Schiele, played by Mathieu Carrière. Jacques Rivette collaborated with her in Love on the Ground (1983) and La Belle Noiseuse (1991, Nominated Césars best supporting actress). In 1985, she co-starred with John Gielgud in Leave All Fair (1985).

She appeared in Merchant Ivory's A Soldier's Daughter Never Cries (1998) (which also used her song "Di Doo Dah") and in Merci Docteur Rey (2002). The end title song for Le Divorce (2003) featured her singing "L'Anamour", composed by Gainsbourg. In 2006, she played the title role in Elektra, directed by Philippe Calvario in France.

Birkin recorded the song "Beauty" on French producer Hector Zazou's album Strong Currents (2003). The cover art of Have You Fed the Fish? (2002) by singer-songwriter Badly Drawn Boy features her image and backing vocals by her daughter, Charlotte Gainsbourg. In 2006 she recorded and released the album Fictions, and in 2010, recorded a duet with Brazilian singer Sérgio Dias, which appeared on We Are the Lilies, an album by Dias and French band Tahiti Boy and the Palmtree Family; the album also featured contributions from Iggy Pop and others.

In 2016, Birkin appeared in an ongoing campaign for Yves Saint Laurent shot by Hedi Slimane, which featured various female musicians, including Marianne Faithfull, Courtney Love, and Joni Mitchell. The same year, she had the lead role in La femme et le TGV, a short film directed by Swiss filmmaker Timo von Gunten. The film was nominated for an Academy Award for Best Live Action Short Film. In a 2017 interview, Birkin stated that La femme et le TGV would be her final acting performance, and that she had no plans to return to acting.

On 24 March 2017, Birkin released Birkin/Gainsbourg: Le Symphonique, a collection of songs Gainsbourg had written for her during and after their relationship, reworked with full orchestral arrangements. In September 2017, she performed live in Brussels in support of the album.

Personal life 
Birkin was married in 1965 to John Barry, who composed the music for many James Bond films and numerous other movies. They met when Barry cast Birkin in his musical Passion Flower Hotel. Their daughter, the photographer Kate Barry, was born on 8 April 1967 and died on 11 December 2013. The marriage ended in 1968.

She had a passionate and creative relationship with her mentor Serge Gainsbourg, whom she met on the set of Slogan in 1968. They were together 12 years but never married, despite rumours and misreporting to the contrary. In 1971, they had a daughter,  actress and singer Charlotte Gainsbourg. They separated in 1980.

On 4 September 1982, she gave birth to her third daughter, Lou Doillon, from her relationship with director Jacques Doillon. They separated in the 1990s. The Observer reported in 2007 that Doillon "could not compete with her grief for Gainsbourg" (who died in 1991), and that she had lived alone since their separation. Later, Birkin had a relationship with French writer Olivier Rolin.

Her grandchildren are Roman de Kermadec (born 1987) from Kate Barry, Ben (born 1997), Alice (born 2002), and Jo (born 2011) from Charlotte Gainsbourg, and Marlowe (born 2002) from Lou Doillon.

Birkin has mainly resided in Paris since the late 1960s.

On 6 September 2021, it was reported that Birkin is doing well after having a stroke.

Philanthropy 
Birkin's humanitarian interests have led her to work with Amnesty International on immigrant welfare and the AIDS epidemic. She has visited Bosnia, Rwanda, Israel and Palestine.

Awards and honours 

In 2001, Birkin was awarded the OBE. She has also been awarded the French Ordre National du Mérite. She won the "Best Actress" award at the 1985 Orleans Film Festival for Leave All Fair. The jury of the 1985 Venice Film Festival recognised Birkin's performance in Dust as amongst the best of the year, but decided not to award a best actress prize because all of the actresses they judged to have made the best performances were in films that won major awards. Dust won the Silver Lion prize. In 2018, she received Japanese Order of the Rising Sun.

In popular culture

Birkin basket 
Birkin carried a hand-woven Castro Marim, Algarve, Portugal straw basket everywhere, from the market, to nightclubs, to formal events, until Jacques Doillon intentionally ran over it with his car.

Birkin bag 

In 1983, Hermès chief executive Jean-Louis Dumas was seated next to Birkin on a flight from Paris to London. Birkin had just placed her straw basket in the overhead compartment of her seat, but the contents fell to the floor, leaving her to scramble to replace the contents. Birkin explained to Dumas that it had been difficult to find a leather weekend bag she liked. In 1984, he created a black supple leather bag for her: the Birkin bag, based on a 1982 design. She used the bag initially, but later changed her mind because she was carrying too many things in it: "What's the use of having a second one?" she said laughingly. "You only need one and that busts your arm; they're bloody heavy. I'm going to have an operation for tendonitis in the shoulder." Nonetheless, Birkin did use the bag for some time. The Birkin bag has, over the years, become a status symbol, with prices ranging from US$10,000 to $500,000.

In 2015, Birkin wrote a public letter to Hermès requesting her name be removed from the bag, stating she wanted the company to "debaptise the Birkin Croco until better practices in line with international norms can be put in place," referring to the cruel methods used to acquire the skins for the bags. Hermès announced soon afterwards that it had satisfied Birkin with new reassurances on this.

Discography 

Studio albums
 Je t'aime... moi non plus (1969, with Serge Gainsbourg)
 Di doo dah (1973)
 Lolita Go Home (1975)
 Ex fan des sixties (1978)
 Baby Alone in Babylone (1983)
 Lost Song (1987)
 Amours des feintes (1990)
 Versions Jane (1996)
 À la légère (1999)
 Rendez-vous (2004)
 Fictions (2006)
 Enfants d'Hiver (2008)
 Birkin/Gainsbourg: Le symphonique (2017)
 Oh! Pardon tu dormais… (2020)

Live albums
 Jane Birkin au Bataclan (1987)
 Integral au Casino de Paris (1992)
 Integral a l'Olympia (1996)
 Arabesque (2002)
 Au palace (live) (2009)
 Jane Birkin Sings Serge Gainsbourg via Japan (2012)

Filmography

Film

Television

See also 
 Birkin bag
 Serge Gainsbourg discography

References

External links 

 Official website (archived, 9 Feb 2019)
 
  Jane Birkin at AllMusic
 
 CNN interview with Jane Birkin

20th-century English actresses
21st-century English actresses
English expatriates in France
English film actresses
People from Marylebone
Actresses from London
English television actresses
French-language singers
Officers of the Order of the British Empire
1946 births
Living people
Serge Gainsbourg
English democracy activists
Knights of the Ordre national du Mérite
English women pop singers
Jane
English emigrants to France